KXSC (104.9 FM) is a radio station based in Sunnyvale, California, serving the San Francisco Bay Area. It is owned by the University of Southern California and airs a classical music format as a full-time simulcast of KDFC in San Francisco. The station broadcasts in HD.

History 
KXSC (104.9 FM) began in 1961 as KHYD, a 3,000–watt station operating from a house on Mowry Avenue in Fremont, California.

The station call letters changed to KFMR in 1964. 18-year-old Bill Stairs was among the alumni of early days of KFMR who went on to a career as a DJ, program director and broadcast consultant in markets from Spokane, Sacramento and San Diego in the west to Boston and Chicago in the east. Another early DJ at KFMR was writer Timothy Perrin, winner of the 2007 Angie Award for best screenplay. Under new ownership in the early 1980s, KFMR changed to a religious format.

In 1983, it became Spanish-language KDOS 104.9, as La Chiquitita with its studios in Fremont. By December 1983, the station adopted KBRG call letters that had been abandoned by another station earlier that year. In 1986, brothers Danny Villanueva and James Villanueva, owners of Radio América, Inc, Bahia Radio, purchased KBRG. The station became "La Nueva KBRG" from 1986 to 1992. The station continued the Spanish-language music and variety format and aired Oakland Athletics baseball games in Spanish, with Amaury Pi-Gonzalez as announcer. In 1989, EXCL Communications purchased KBRG 104.9 from Radio América, Inc and flipped to a Spanish AC format known as Super Estrella, the station was still licensed to Fremont, California. The format was rebranded to Radio Romantica in the mid 1990s. 

As the Hispanic population grew in the East Bay during the 1990s. EXCL was vying to find a stronger signal other than 104.9 which only covers the South Bay. On December 31, 1997 EXCL reached a deal with American Radio Systems, in a three-station frequency swap, EXCL's KBRG moved to 100.3 and 104.9 became KUFX.

In August 1998, the station's owners (Jacor) changed the format to modern adult contemporary and the call letters to KLDZ. Six months later, the format and call letters were changed to new wave music/alternative rock classics KCNL, which was switched to alternative rock on January 15, 2001. KCNL's call letters were briefly changed to KMJO on October 14, 2005, and changed back to KCNL ten days later, though there was no format change involved. It was likely that Clear Channel Communications (now iHeartMedia), the owners at the time, wanted to park the KMJO call letters temporarily.

On January 1, 2006, KCNL dropped alternative rock and flipped to Spanish. It was named "La Romántica" for a couple of months, but was later renamed "Enamorada 104.9". Ratings for the station had dropped from a 3.4 share to a 1.3 share during that time. Because of this, KCNL announced the return of the alternative rock format in late February 2007. The station relaunched on February 28, 2007, with "Beautiful Day" by U2 as the first song in the resurrected Channel 104.9 format. After 11 months without airstaff, on January 22, 2008, "Joe" returned to host afternoons.

On September 18, 2009, KCNL switched to the "La Preciosa" Spanish-adult hits format. On March 2, 2010, Clear Channel Communications sold the station to Principle Broadcasting Network (San Jose, California) for $5 million. KCNL changed to the "iFM" Spanish-language variety format. On Saturday and Sunday nights from 8 pm to midnight, KCNL aired "Save Alternative," which also aired 24 hours a day on an HD2 channel and online at www.savealternative.com.

According to Radio Survivor, on March 30, 2012, Principle Broadcasting Network sold KCNL to the University of Southern California for $7.5 million. On May 2, 2012, it was announced that the Spanish-language format would end on Memorial Day (May 28), 2012. On May 20, 2012, "Save Alternative" ceased broadcasting on KCNL-HD2. On May 25, 2012, the call letters were changed to KXSC and the format to classical music, broadcasting programming from KDFC to the South Bay and the Peninsula areas. The change took place three days earlier than originally planned.

Additional frequencies 
In addition to KXSC, the programming of KDFC is transmitted by these stations and translators to widen its broadcast area.
 KDFC — 90.3 FM, licensed to San Francisco, California
 KOSC — 89.9 FM, licensed to Angwin, California
 KDFG — 103.9 FM, licensed to Seaside, California
 K212AA — 90.3 FM, licensed to Los Gatos, California
 K223AJ — 92.5 FM, licensed to Lakeport, California

References

 The Enamorada KCNL Home Page, as of April 2, 2006 from Internet Archive
 “Channel 104.9” KCNL changes from Alternative Classics to Alternative

External links 

XSC
Radio stations established in 1961
Sunnyvale, California
Classical music radio stations in the United States
Mass media in San Jose, California